Venets (also transliterated Venec or Venetz, meaning "wreath") is a village in northeastern Bulgaria, part of Shumen Province. It is the administrative centre of the homonymous Venets Municipality, which lies in the northwestern part of Shumen Province. The Venets Transmitter built in 1975 with the tallest radio mast in the country as well and the most powerful TV transmitter is located nearby.

Villages in Shumen Province